"The Millennium Prayer" is a song recorded by English singer Cliff Richard, in which the words of the Lord's Prayer are set to the tune of "Auld Lang Syne". It was released in November 1999 as a charity single in the lead-up to the new millennium, hence the name. The single became a surprise hit reaching number one in the UK Singles Chart, number two in Australia and New Zealand, number three in Ireland, and the top 20 in a number of European countries.

The original adaption of "The Lord's Prayer" to "Auld Lang Syne" (a contrafactum) was created by composer Paul Field and writer Stephen Deal as the finale to the Christian musical Hopes & Dreams (a Share Jesus International production). It is the only single that credits Jesus as a lyricist. The original recording of the song, also sung by Richard, featured on the musical's soundtrack album Hopes & Dreams: A New Musical For A New Millennium released in January 1999. Paul Field had also told Richard of his wife's suggestion, "that it would make a great Christmas single for Cliff." Richard took up the suggestion and recorded a new version for release as a single in the lead up to Christmas, with Field hearing of the recording from Richard after it had been recorded.

Richard's record label, EMI, declined to release it amid concerns for its commercial potential, so Richard approached the independent record label Papillon Records for the release, with the proceeds going to the charity Children's Promise.

Richard performed the song exclusively on the TV programme An Audience with... Cliff Richard before a music video had been made for it. Richard asked, during breaks, for a room with a camera and green screen; he would then record all of the footage of him to be used in the video for "The Millennium Prayer" in less than an hour.

The song was beaten to the British Christmas number-one single for 1999 by Westlife, having been number one for the three preceding weeks. It was also Richard's 14th UK No. 1 hit, his 112th hit overall, the third highest-selling single of his career. The song reached No. 2 in a poll of all-time worst singles in 2003 run by Channel 4. The song won the Ivor Novello Award for the best selling single of 1999. Richard released the single with neutral view, stating it was a way in which people could unite, regardless of their belief system or religion they adhere to.

The version Richard released as a single was not taken from any album, however the following year the song was included in Richard's compilation album The Whole Story: His Greatest Hits and in 2003 on his album Cliff at Christmas.

Charts and certifications

Weekly charts

Year-end charts

Certifications

References

1999 singles
Cliff Richard songs
Number-one singles in Scotland
UK Singles Chart number-one singles
UK Independent Singles Chart number-one singles
Charity singles
Christian songs
Songs written by Paul Field (Christian singer)
1999 songs